John Mason Martin (January 20, 1837 – June 16, 1898) was a U.S. Representative from Alabama, son of Joshua Lanier Martin.

Biography
Born in Athens, Alabama, Martin attended the common schools, the high school in Green Springs, Alabama, and the University of Alabama at Tuscaloosa.
He was graduated from Centre College, Danville, Kentucky, in 1856.
He studied law.
He was admitted to the bar in 1858 and commenced practice in Tuscaloosa, Alabama.
He served as member of the State senate in 1871–1876 and served as president pro tempore in 1873–1876.
He was professor of equity jurisprudence in the University of Alabama in 1875–1886.

Martin was elected as a Democrat to the Forty-ninth Congress (March 4, 1885 – March 3, 1887).
He was an unsuccessful candidate for reelection in 1886 to the Fiftieth Congress.
He resumed the practice of law in Birmingham, Alabama.
He died in Bowling Green, Kentucky, June 16, 1898.
He was interred in Greenwood Cemetery, Tuscaloosa, Alabama.

References

External links

1837 births
1898 deaths
People from Athens, Alabama
Centre College alumni
Democratic Party members of the United States House of Representatives from Alabama
19th-century American politicians
Democratic Party Alabama state senators